Every Day Is Halloween: The Anthology is a compilation/remix album by Ministry, released on October 5, 2010. It features songs originally recorded by AC/DC, Jimi Hendrix, The Rolling Stones and Amy Winehouse. It was also released under the names Every Day Is Halloween: Greatest Tricks and Undercover. The latter is credited to Ministry and Co-Conspirators and has a different track list.

Track listing

Personnel
Alien Jourgensen – vocals, bass (1, 2, 5, 7, 9–11), keyboards (1, 5, 6, 8, 10), slide solo (3, 11), bass samples (4), rhythm guitar (4, 10), mandolin (5, 9), lead guitar (10), horn arrangements (12), production
Mike Scaccia – rhythm & lead guitar (1–3, 5, 7–9, 11, 12), classical guitar (5), guitar (6), bass (8, 12)
Erie Loch – programming (2, 4), additional programming/remixing
Liz Constantine – vocals (6)
Paul Raven – bass (6)
Tommy Victor – guitar (6)
Samuel D'Ambruoso – background vocals (9, 11), engineer, drum programming
Andrew Davidson – background vocals (9, 11, 12), assistant engineer, programming
Billy Gibbons – guitar (11)
Karma Cheema – background vocals (12), assistant engineer, programming
Jurgen Engler – production (13)
Dave Donnelly – mastering

References

2010 compilation albums
Albums produced by Al Jourgensen
Cleopatra Records compilation albums
Ministry (band) albums